Lotto may refer to:

 Lotto, original, 15th century name of the Italian lottery
 Lotto (Milan Metro), a railway station in Milan, Italy
 Lotto carpet, a carpet having a lacy arabesque pattern 
 Lotto Sport Italia, an Italian sports apparel manufacturer
 Lotto–Soudal, a Belgian cycling team
 "Lotto" (The Office), a 2011 episode of the US television series
 Lotto (band), a Polish alternative rock trio
 Lotto (album), by EXO
 "Lotto" (song), by EXO
 "Lotto", a song by Joyner Lucas from the 2020 album ADHD
 Lorenzo Lotto (c. 1480–1556/57), Italian painter, draughtsman and illustrator
 Myron P. Lotto (1925-2017), American politician

See also

Lotta (disambiguation)
Lotte (disambiguation)
Lotti (given name)
Lotty